The Imperial Lyceum (Императорский Царскосельский лицей, Imperatorskiy Tsarskosel'skiy litsey) in Tsarskoye Selo near Saint Petersburg, also known historically as the Imperial Alexander Lyceum after its founder Tsar Alexander I, was an educational institution which was founded in 1811 with the object of educating youths of the best families who would afterwards occupy important posts in the Imperial service.

Its regulations were published on 11 January 1811, but they had received the Imperial sanction on 12 August 1810, when the four-story "new" wing of the Great Palace was appointed for its accommodation, with special premises for a hospital, a kitchen and other domestic requirements, as well as a residence for the administrative staff. Furniture and utensils were given together with the Neoclassical building, designed by Vasily Stasov, next to the Catherine Palace.

The Tsarskoye Selo Lyceum was opened on 19 October 1811. The first graduates included Alexander Pushkin and Alexander Gorchakov. The opening date was celebrated each year with carousals and revels, and Pushkin composed new verses for each of those occasions. In January 1844 the Lyceum was moved to St Petersburg.

During the 33 years of the Tsarskoye Selo Lyceum's existence, there were 286 graduates. The most famous of these, in addition to the above two, were Anton Delvig, Wilhelm Kuchelbecker, Nicholas de Giers, Dmitry Tolstoy, Yakov Grot, Nikolay Danilevsky, Aleksey Lobanov-Rostovsky, Fyodor Shcherbatskoy and Mikhail Saltykov-Shchedrin.

See also
 List of Tsarskoye Selo Lyceum people

External links
 THE IMPERIAL LYCEUM (in English) - from Tsarskoye Selo in 1910
 Pushkin and the Lyceum (in Russian)

Buildings and structures in Pushkin
Vasily Stasov buildings and structures
Schools in Saint Petersburg
Educational institutions established in 1811
1810s establishments in the Russian Empire
Educational institutions disestablished in 1917
1917 disestablishments in Russia
Lyceums in Russia
Cultural heritage monuments of federal significance in Saint Petersburg